Alapati or Aalapati is an Indian given name. Notable people with the name include:

 Alapati Dharma Rao (1930–2003), Indian politician
 Alapati Leiua (born 1988), New Zealand rugby union footballer
 Alapati Venkataramaiah (1917–1965), Indian minister and freedom fighter from Andhra Pradesh

Indian given names